Nikolai Yurevich Ukk (born 20 February 1980) is a Russian badminton player. He won the men's doubles title at the 2011 National Championships partnered with Andrey Ashmarin. Reside in Saint Petersburg, Ukk now works as a trainer-teacher of the badminton at the Kometa Sports School. In 2013, he won Hellas International tournament in men's doubles event with his partner Nikolaj Nikolaenko.

Achievements

BWF International Challenge/Series 
Men's doubles

Mixed doubles

  BWF International Challenge tournament
  BWF International Series tournament
  BWF Future Series tournament

References

External links 
 

1980 births
Living people
Sportspeople from Saint Petersburg
Russian male badminton players